Ville Platte is the largest city in, and the parish seat of, Evangeline Parish, Louisiana, United States. The population was 7,430 at the 2010 census, down from 8,145 in 2000. The city's name is of French origin, roughly translating to "flat town", in reference to its relatively flat topography in contrast to the more hilly terrain north of the area.

History

The area around Ville Platte appears to have been first settled during the last half of the eighteenth century, when Louisiana was under Spanish rule. The earliest record of settlement in the immediate area of Ville Platte was in the 1780s.

Popular legend states the founder of Ville Platte was Marcellin Garand, an adjutant major in the Army of the French Empire during the reign of Napoleon. In 1824, Garand obtained one of the first two lots that were platted in what is now Ville Platte, with the second being obtained by a Doctor Robert Windex. Those lots were obtained from the estate of William O'Donegan. This appears to be the actual beginning of, or the founding of, the present town of Ville Platte.

The first post office in Ville Platte was established in 1842 with Marcellin Garand as postmaster from 1842 to 1848.

Geography
Ville Platte is located in eastern Evangeline Parish at  (30.689140, -92.277534).

U.S. Route 167 passes through the city as Main Street (eastbound) and Lasalle Street (westbound). The highway leads southeast  to Opelousas and north  to Alexandria. Louisiana Highway 10 passes through the city in tandem with US 167 but leads northwest  to Oakdale.

Demographics

2020 census

As of the 2020 United States census, there were 6,303 people, 3,007 households, and 1,686 families residing in the city.

2000 census
As of the census of 2000, there were 8,145 people, 3,169 households, and 2,047 families residing in the city. The racial makeup of the city was 40.53% White, 58.67% African American, 0.21% Native American, 0.07% Asian, 0.11% from other races, and 0.41% from two or more races. Hispanic or Latino of any race were 1.23% of the population.

There were 3,169 households, out of which 32.6% had children under the age of 18 living with them, 35.9% were married couples living together, 24.5% had a female householder with no husband present, and 35.4% were non-families. 33.0% of all households were made up of individuals, and 16.3% had someone living alone who was 65 years of age or older. The average household size was 2.48 and the average family size was 3.17.

In the city, the population was spread out, with 30.9% under the age of 18, 9.1% from 18 to 24, 23.7% from 25 to 44, 19.3% from 45 to 64, and 17.0% who were 65 years of age or older. The median age was 34 years. For every 100 females, there were 85.5 males. For every 100 females age 18 and over, there were 79.1 males.

The median income for a household in the city was $12,917, and the median income for a family was $18,056. Males had a median income of $29,798 versus $16,563 for females. The per capita income for the city was $9,672. About 43.5% of families and 50.9% of the population were below the poverty line, including 68.9% of those under age 18 and 32.5% of those age 65 or over.

Education

Public schools in Evangeline Parish are operated by the Evangeline Parish School Board. Three campuses are located in Ville Platte - James Stephens Montessori School (Grades PK-4), Ville Platte Elementary School (Grades PK-4), and Ville Platte High School (Grades 5-12).

There are also two private schools. Sacred Heart of Jesus Catholic School is a Roman Catholic school, serving grades K-12. Christian Heritage Academy is a Christian school, serving grades PK-12.

The famous St. Landry Parish Sheriff Cat Doucet was educated in Ville Platte.

Culture
Ville Platte is located northwest of Louisiana's Cajun country. The town is famous for its smoked meat and swamp pop music and bills itself as "Smoked Meat Capital of the World". Ville Platte has been officially designated by the Louisiana Legislature at the "Swamp Pop Capital of the World," recognizing the town's "long, rich history of fostering the development of swamp pop music."

Ville Platte has significant Creole and Cajun cultural associations (cuisine, music, language etc.). It lies at the northern point of the "French Triangle" with a significant francophone population residing in the city as well as the parish. It is one of the birthplaces of the Afro-creole zydeco music that has become one of the signatures of Louisiana culture throughout the world, as well as the Choctaw-Métis tradition of "viande boucanee" or smoked meat.

Ville Platte hosts two large festivals each year. The Louisiana Cotton festival, run in conjunction with the Le Tournoi, and the Festival de la Viande Bouccanee (Smoked Meat Festival) are held in Ville Platte annually. Ville Platte and the surrounding areas participate in the traditional Mardi Gras held in Mamou.

Radio host Jim Soileau, the "Voice of KVPI" throughout most of the past 50 years, is semi-retired but still hosts the French News as well as co-hosts "La Tasse de Café" ("The Cup of Coffee") on Monday and Wednesday mornings. He has one of the most recognized voices in Acadiana and hosted "This is Mamou Cajun radio" from location at Fred's Lounge for many years.

Government

Former U.S. Representative T. Ashton Thompson of Louisiana's 7th congressional district, since disbanded, was born in Ville Platte in 1916. He died in office in 1965 as a result of injuries sustained in an automobile accident in Gastonia, North Carolina. His death paved the way for Edwin Washington Edwards to assume the seat.

Walter L. Lee served as the Evangeline Parish Clerk of Court for 56 years, from 1956 to 2012.

The current mayor, Ryan Leday Williams, was elected in 2022 after defeating incumbent mayor Jennifer Vidrine, who was the first woman and first African American to hold the position.

City officials:
Mayor: Ryan Leday Williams (D), 2023–present
Chief of Police: Al Perry Thomas (D), 2023–present
City Marshall: Nicole Snoddy, 2020-present
City Clerk: Hilda Edwards
City Judge: J. Gregory Vidrine, 2014–present
City Attorney: Eric Lafleur
Members of the City Council:
District A: Faye Lemoine, 2018–present
District B: Anna L. Frank (D), 2023–present
District C: Tracey Jagneaux (R), 2023–present
District D: Shawn D. Roy (D), 2023–present
District E: Christina Sam (D), 2022–present
District F: Bryant Riggs (D), 2014–present

Members of the Louisiana Legislature:

 Senate, District 28:  Heather Cloud (R), 2020–present
 House of Representatives, District 38:  Rhonda Butler (R), 2020–present

Points of interest 
Chicot State Park
Alexis LaTour House
Flat Town Music Co

References

External links
City of Ville Platte official website
Mercy Regional Medical Center
Ville Platte Gazette

Cities in Louisiana
Cities in Evangeline Parish, Louisiana
Parish seats in Louisiana
Populated places established in 1846
1846 establishments in Louisiana